Parashorea globosa (also called white seraya) is a species of plant in the family Dipterocarpaceae. It is found in Indonesia and Malaysia.

References

globosa
Endangered plants
Taxonomy articles created by Polbot